Panevėžys Combined Heat and Power Plant is a natural gas-fired power plant in Panevėžys, Lithuania.

References

Energy infrastructure completed in 2008
2008 establishments in Lithuania
Cogeneration power stations in Lithuania
Natural gas-fired power stations in Lithuania
Buildings and structures in Panevėžys